Duroğlu is a belde (town) in the central district (Giresun) of Giresun Province, Turkey. At  Duroğlu is situated along the Aksu River. The population of Duroğlu was 2919 as of 2013. The town which is thought to be five centuries old was probably a caravan stop between the Black Sea coast and Central Anatolia in the historical times.

References

Populated places in Giresun Province
Towns in Turkey
Giresun Central District